Melphina hulstaerti is a butterfly in the family Hesperiidae. It is found in the Democratic Republic of the Congo (Équateur and Tshuapa).

References

Butterflies described in 1974
Erionotini
Endemic fauna of the Democratic Republic of the Congo